Aag is a 1994 Indian Hindi-language action drama film directed by K. Ravi Shankar. It stars Govinda, Shilpa Shetty and Sonali Bendre and served as the remake of the film Maruthu Pandi.

Plot summary
Orphaned at a very young age, Raju lives a poor lifestyle with his unmarried sister, Laxmi, in India. Both are of marriageable age. One day Raju meets an attractive fellow-collegian, Parul, and after a few encounters with another fellow-collegian, Bobby, both fall in love. But Parul's uncle, Jagpal, has already arranged her marriage with Police Inspector Suryadev Singh. When Suryadev finds out that Parul is refusing to marry him, he arrests Raju on a charge of murder, holds him in a cell, and beats him mercilessly.

Laxmi, quite dramatically, takes a gun from a police officer, and helps Raju escape so as to prevent Parul from being forcibly married to Suryadev. They do manage to arrive in time, only to find out that Parul has consumed poison and killed herself. Raju is beside himself with rage, but is captured by the police, and watches helplessly as Parul is cremated. His horrors have not ended as Suryadev sexually assault's Laxmi and leaves her in a mentally unstable condition.

Raju takes Laxmi with him to a small village, where he hides her from other people as she has become visibly pregnant, and changes his name to Birju. He meets with a lovely village belle by the name of Bijli, who wants to marry him. What Raju does not know is that Bijli is a plainclothes policewoman, Inspector Barkha Sharma, who has been assigned to arrest him at any cost. She does confront him, and he confesses to killing Parul's uncle, Jagpal, and Barkha calls for reinforcements to escort Raju to jail. The Inspector in charge of the reinforcements is none other than Suryadev — and this time, he is determined to finish Raju once and for all.

Cast
 Govinda as Raju/Birju
 Sonali Bendre as Parul 
 Shilpa Shetty as Bijli / Inspector Barkha Sharma 
 Shakti Kapoor as Inspector Suryadev Singh
 Mohnish Behl as Bobby
 Gulshan Grover as Chhote thakur Madhav Singh
 Kader Khan as Tolaram
 Sadashiv Amrapurkar as Bholaram
 Goga Kapoor as Thakur Madan Singh
 Avtar Gill as Jagpal
 Raju Shrestha as Parul's Brother
 Prajakta Kulkarni as Raju's Sister
 Vikas Anand as Police Commissioner
 Suhas Joshi as Tolaram and Bholaram's mother
 Viju Khote as Village Doctor
 Dinesh Hingoo as Muthukrishnan Swami

Soundtrack
All songs were written by Sameer and composed by Dilip Sen-Sameer Sen

References

External links
 

1994 films
1990s action drama films
1990s Hindi-language films
Indian action drama films
Hindi remakes of Tamil films
Films scored by Dilip Sen-Sameer Sen
Indian films about revenge
Films directed by K. Ravi Shankar
1994 drama films